Kalinowski (other spellings listed below) is a surname which is most frequent in north-eastern Poland. It comes from place names such as Kalinowa, Kalinowo, and Kalinów, which are derived from the word kalina ("Viburnum"). It is related to the following surnames in other languages:

People 
Kalinowski family
Andrzej Kalinowski (died 1531), Polish nobleman
Jan Kalinowski (1857–1941), Polish naturalist who settled in Peru
Efim Kalinovsky(1892-?) - nobleman, prince, Russian military leader, participant in the First World War and the Civil War. Cavalier of St. George. Major General of the White Army, head of the Kolchakov division. Participated in the First World War. In the Russian army - the head of the Kolchakov division; where he was promoted to major general.
Jarosław Kalinowski (born 1962), Polish politician
John Kalinowski (1946–2013), British music manage
Konstanty Kalinowski (1838–1864), Polish-Belarusian writer, journalist, lawyer and revolutionary
Lothar Kalinowsky (1899–1992), American psychiatrist
Łukasz Kalinowski (born 1983), Polish football
Małgorzata Kalinowska-Iszkowska, Polish computer scientist
Marcin Kalinowski (c. 1605 – 1652), Polish nobleman
Raphael Kalinowski (1835–1907), Saint
Zygmunt Kalinowski (born 1949), Polish footballer

See also
 
 
Kalinowski agouti (Dasyprocta kalinowskii), a rodent of Peru
Kalinowski's mastiff bat (Mormopterus kalinowskii), of Peru and Chile
Kalinowski's mouse opossum (Hyladelphys kalinowskii), of South America
Kalinowski's Oldfield mouse (Thomasomys kalinowskii), of Peru

References 

Polish-language surnames